Euphorbia abdita is a member of the spurge family, Euphorbiaceae. It is endemic to the Galápagos Islands.

References

abdita
Endemic flora of Galápagos